Wray is the home rule municipality that is the county seat of  Yuma County, Colorado, United States. Located in the Colorado Plains, the city is 170 miles east of Denver, 9 miles west of the Nebraska state line, and 25 miles northwest of the Kansas state line. The population was 2,358 at the 2020 United States census.

History
A post office called Wray has been in operation since 1882. The community was named after John Wray, a cattleman.

Wray was named an "All-America City" in 1993 by the National Civic League.

Geography
Wray is located at  (40.076721, -102.225873), near the intersection of U.S. Highway 34 and U.S. Highway 385.

Climate
Wray has a semi-arid continental climate.

Demographics

As of the census of 2000, there were 2,187 people, 888 households, and 547 families residing in the city. The racial makeup of the city was 94.42% White, 0.09% African American, 0.27% Native American, 0.09% Asian, 3.48% from other races, and 1.65% from two or more races. Hispanic or Latino of any race were 10.01% of the population.

There were 888 households, out of which 30.3% had children under the age of 18 living with them, 51.9% were married couples living together, 7.8% had a female householder with no husband present, and 38.3% were non-families. 35.1% of all households were made up of individuals, and 18.5% had someone living alone who was 65 years of age or older.  The average household size was 2.38 and the average family size was 3.11.

In the city, the population was spread out, with 26.7% under the age of 18, 7.0% from 18 to 24, 24.6% from 25 to 44, 21.3% from 45 to 64, and 20.3% who were 65 years of age or older.  The median age was 39 years. For every 100 females, there were 88.7 males.  For every 100 females age 18 and over, there were 85.1 males.

The median income for a household in the city was $29,052, and the median income for a family was $38,942. Males had a median income of $26,847 versus $19,250 for females. The per capita income for the city was $16,547.  About 11.3% of families and 14.5% of the population were below the poverty line, including 14.8% of those under age 18 and 14.5% of those age 65 or over.

Education
The school mascot is the Eagles for high school and Eaglets in the lower grades.  School colors are purple and white and the Eaglets were blue and white but were changed to purple and white to match the high school in 2011.

Health care
The town and surrounding area are served by the Wray Community District Hospital.

See also

Outline of Colorado
Index of Colorado-related articles
State of Colorado
Colorado cities and towns
Colorado municipalities
Colorado counties
Yuma County, Colorado

References

External links

City of Wray
Map of Wray, CDOT

Cities in Colorado
Cities in Yuma County, Colorado
County seats in Colorado